The Myanmar Restaurant Association (MRA) is Myanmar's food industry association. It was established in 2011 under the supervision of the Ministry of Hotels and Tourism.

References

Trade associations based in Myanmar
Organizations established in 2011
Burmese cuisine
2011 establishments in Myanmar
Food industry trade groups